The Dog Who Loved Trains, is a 1977 Yugoslav film directed by Goran Paskaljević.

The film was nominated for the Golden Bear award at the 28th Berlin International Film Festival in 1978.

The plot revolves around an escaped female convict, Mika, and a travelling rodeo entertainer who team up. Together, they meet a young man on a mission to find his dog, Ding, which went missing a year earlier when it ran onto a train.

Cast
 Svetlana Bojković - Mika
 Irfan Mensur - Mladić (Young Man)
 Bata Živojinović - Rodoljub "Rodney" Aleksić
 Pavle Vuisić - Uncle
 Danilo Stojković - Father
 Ljiljana Jovanović - Mother
 Dušan Janićijević - Žuti (Yellow)
 Dragomir Čumić - Mechanic
 Katica Želi - Female Convict
 Miroslava Bobić - Female Guard
 Gordana Pavlov - Sister
 Janez Vrhovec - Railwayman
 Boro Begović - Guard

References

External links

1977 films
Yugoslav comedy-drama films
Serbian comedy-drama films
Serbo-Croatian-language films
1970s road comedy-drama films
Circus films
Films directed by Goran Paskaljević
1977 comedy films
1977 drama films
Films set in Yugoslavia
Films set in Belgrade